Święta is the name of two villages in Poland:
 Święta, Greater Poland Voivodeship
 Święta, West Pomeranian Voivodeship

Święta means saint or holy and appears in many more Polish place names:
 Święta Lipka
 Święta Katarzyna, Lower Silesian Voivodeship
 Święta Katarzyna, Świętokrzyskie Voivodeship
 Święta Anna, Silesian Voivodeship
 Nowa Święta